Scythris productella is a species of moth belonging to the family Scythrididae.

It is native to Europe.

References

Scythrididae
Moths described in 1839